The Farmers and Mechanics Bank of Middletown, Connecticut is a former bank that operated from 1858 to 1996, when it was incorporated into Citizens Bank of Connecticut.

Its main office was long located at 225 Main St. in Middletown, at the intersection of Main and College Streets. The bank building was built in 1920.

The bank was founded in 1858;  medical Dr. William B. Casey was its first president.  It served workers at nearby brownstone quarries, including many Irish immigrants.

The building is a contributing building in the National Register of Historic Places-listed Main Street Historic District.

References 

Banks based in Connecticut
Historic district contributing properties in Connecticut
National Register of Historic Places in Middlesex County, Connecticut
American companies established in 1858
Banks established in 1858
1858 establishments in Connecticut
Banks disestablished in 1996
1996 disestablishments in Connecticut
Defunct banks of the United States
Commercial buildings on the National Register of Historic Places in Connecticut